Rafael Nadal defeated Novak Djokovic in the final, 6–2, 7–5 to win the men's singles tennis title at the 2007 Indian Wells Masters. He did not lose a single set in the entire tournament. By reaching the final, Djokovic entered the world's top 10 in rankings for the first time in his career.

Roger Federer was the three-time defending champion, but lost in the second round to Guillermo Cañas.

Seeds
All thirty-two seeds received a bye into the second round.

Draw

Finals

Top half

Section 1

Section 2

Section 3

Section 4

Bottom half

Section 5

Section 6

Section 7

Section 8

External links
2007 Pacific Life Open Draw
2007 Pacific Life Open Qualifying Draw

Men's Singles